Franz Park is a neighborhood of St. Louis, Missouri.

Demographics

In 2020 Franz Park's racial makeup was 80.4% White, 6.0% Black, 0.2% Native American, 2.9% Asian, 7.7% Two or More Races, and 2.8% Some Other Race. 5.0% of the population was of Hispanic or Latino origin.

See also
 Clayton/Tamm, St. Louis, in the east
 Ellendale, St. Louis, neighborhood directly to the south
 Hi-Pointe, St. Louis, in the north
 Dogtown, St. Louis, general area including all 4 neighborhoods

References

External links
 Franz Park neighborhood website

Irish-American neighborhoods
Neighborhoods in St. Louis